Youssef Rabeh (born 13 April 1985 in Rabat) is a former Moroccan football player, who played mainly for Wydad AC.

Career
He is born in the capital of the Morocco Rabat and started his career in local team FUS de Rabat.
In 2005 Rabeh signed for one year with Al-Ahli (Jeddah) from Saudi Arabia. In 2006 Youssef returned in FUS de Rabat for six months. In season 2006/2007 played in other club from Rabat - FAR. With this team Rabeh play final on CAF Confederation Cup in 2006 and is a vice-champion on Morocco in 2007.

Levski Sofia
On 29 July 2007 signed with Levski Sofia.

Rabeh had a few problem with police in Bulgaria, after some incidents in night clubs.

He became a Champion of Bulgaria in 2009.

On 15 August 2009, Rabeh was suspended from the first team after an arrest for drink related incident. However, after a poor performance of Levski's defense, he was allowed to return to the first team.

Rabeh became famous with his non-observance of the regime in Levski, which caused him to be transferred in Russian club Anzhi. Still, during his stay with the Bulgarian side, he received praise for his fine defensive skills and was nicknamed the "Moroccan Beckenbauer".

Anzhi Makhachkala
On 8 February 2010, Levski transferred the Moroccan defender to FC Anzhi Makhachkala, he signed a three-year-deal. Rabeh made his debut for the team from Daghestan in the 1:2 loss against Slavia Sofia in a friendly match, earning himself a booking for a foul on Petar Dimitrov. The match was abandoned in the 60th minute, following a number of complaints from FC Anzhi Makhachkala against referee decisions.
Rabeh's disciplinary woes continued, as he purportedly ran away from his new team's training camp and refused to return. Moreover, he had allegedly borrowed some money from would-be teammate Todor Timonov just before leaving Daghestan, and did not repay him. Thus, he did not make a single official appearance for the Daghestani side and eventually returned to Morocco.

International career
In 2005, he got to semi-final on FIFA U-20 World Cup with Morocco U20.
He earned his first cap with the Atlas Lions in the 4-1 victory over Mauritania on 11 October 2008.

Personal life
Rabeh was involved in several off-the-field incidents during his spell with Levski Sofia, including a three-year suspended prison sentence for drunk driving.

Awards
Levski Sofia
 Champion of Bulgaria 2009
 Bulgarian Supercup 2009
FAR
 CAF Confederation Cup2006 : Runner-up
Wydad Casablanca
CAF Champions League 2017: Winner
CAF Champions League 2011: Runner-up
CAF Champions League 2016 : Semi-Final
Botola 2014-2015 : Winner
Botola 2015-2016: Runner-up
Moroccan u-21
 2005 FIFA World Youth Championship: Fourth place

References

External links
 
 
 Rabeh profile

1985 births
Living people
Footballers from Rabat
Moroccan footballers
Morocco international footballers
Morocco under-20 international footballers
Moroccan expatriate footballers
First Professional Football League (Bulgaria) players
Saudi Professional League players
AS FAR (football) players
Fath Union Sport players
Al-Ahli Saudi FC players
PFC Levski Sofia players
Moghreb Tétouan players
Wydad AC players
Expatriate footballers in Bulgaria
Expatriate footballers in Russia
Expatriate footballers in Saudi Arabia
Moroccan expatriate sportspeople in Belgium
Moroccan expatriate sportspeople in Russia
Moroccan expatriate sportspeople in Saudi Arabia
Association football defenders